Svino is a small village near Kobarid in the Littoral region of Slovenia.
The church in the village is dedicated to Saint Andrew. It is a small Gothic building with a star vaulted sanctuary.

Name
Svino was first attested in written sources in 1321 as Sfigna (and as Sfina in 1351). The name is derived from *Svinьno (selo/poľe)—literally, 'pig (village/field)'—indicating that the villagers originally raised pigs. See also Sinja Gorica, Vinje pri Moravčah, and Zavino for similar names.

Geography

Svino stands on a terrace above the Idrija River.

References

External links

Svino on Geopedia
Svino home page

Populated places in the Municipality of Kobarid